Hamstead Lock is a lock on the Kennet and Avon Canal, at Hamstead Marshall between Kintbury and Newbury, Berkshire,  England.

The lock has a rise/fall of 6 ft 5 in (1.96 m).

It is a grade II listed building.

See also

Locks on the Kennet and Avon Canal

References

Grade II listed buildings in Berkshire
Locks on the Kennet and Avon Canal
Locks of Berkshire
Grade II listed canals
Hamstead Marshall